This is a list of Ontario Hockey League seasons since inception of the league, as well as a list of seasons for its precursor leagues, the Ontario Major Junior Hockey League (OMJHL), and the Ontario Hockey Association Junior A League (OHA).

OHA seasons

1933–34 |
1934–35 |
1935–36 |
1936–37 |
1937–38 |
1938–39 |
1939–40 |
1940–41 |
1941–42 |
1942–43 |
1943–44 |
1944–45 |
1945–46 |
1946–47 |
1947–48 |
1948–49 |
1949–50 |
1950–51 |
1951–52 |
1952–53 |
1953–54 |
1954–55 |
1955–56 |
1956–57 |
1957–58 |
1958–59 |
1959–60 |
1960–61 |
1961–62 |
1962–63 | 
1963–64 |
1964–65 |
1965–66 |
1966–67 |
1967–68 |
1968–69 |
1969–70 |
1970–71 |
1971–72 |
1972–73 |
1973–74

OMJHL seasons
1974–75 |
1975–76 |
1976–77 |
1977–78 |
1978–79 |
1979–80

OHL seasons
1980–81 |
1981–82 |
1982–83 |
1983–84 |
1984–85 |
1985–86 |
1986–87 |
1987–88 |
1988–89 |
1989–90 |
1990–91 |
1991–92 |
1992–93 |
1993–94 |
1994–95 |
1995–96 |
1996–97 |
1997–98 |
1998–99 |
1999–00 |
2000–01 |
2001–02 |
2002–03 |
2003–04 |
2004–05 |
2005–06 |
2006–07 |
2007–08 |
2008–09 |
2009–10 |
2010–11 |
2011–12 |
2012–13 |
2013–14 |
2014–15 |
2015–16 |
2016–17 |
2017–18 |
2018–19 |
2019–20 |
2020–21 |
2021–22

See also
List of WHL seasons
List of QMJHL seasons

OHL

OHL